"Bar Yochai" is a kabbalistic piyyut (poem or hymn) extolling the spiritual attainments of Rabbi Simeon bar Yochai, the purported author of the preeminent kabbalistic work, the Zohar. Composed in the 16th century by Rabbi Shimon Lavi, a Sephardi Hakham and kabbalist in Tripoli, Libya, it is the most prominent and popular kabbalistic hymn, being sung by Jewish communities around the world. The hymn is sung by Sephardi and Ashkenazi Jews alike on Lag BaOmer, the Yom Hillula (anniversary of death) of bar Yochai, and is also sung during synagogue services and at the Shabbat evening meal by certain groups. Incorporating expressions from the Tanakh, rabbinical commentaries, and the Zohar, the hymn displays its author's own mastery of Torah and kabbalah.

History

Author

"Bar Yochai" was written by Rabbi Shimon Lavi (1486–1585), a Sephardi Hakham, kabbalist, physician, astronomer, and poet. Born in Spain, Lavi and his family were forced out of the country by the Spanish Expulsion of 1492 and relocated to Fez, Morocco, where Lavi studied both Torah and kabbalah. In 1549 Lavi set out to immigrate to Israel, but was kidnapped and held for ransom by "Arab bandits". He was redeemed and came to Tripoli, where he found the community lacking spiritual guidance and decided to settle there instead. He is credited with the founding of the community's religious institutions and the revival of Torah study and takkanot (Jewish community regulations) there. He authored the kabbalistic commentary Ketem Paz on the Zohar and a number of other piyyutim which were published together with this work.

Popularity
"Bar Yochai" is the most prominent and popular kabbalistic piyyut, being sung by Jewish communities around the world. It is not known how it was conveyed from Tripoli to Safed, Israel, but in the latter city it was adopted by the disciples of the Arizal, who added it to their Kabbalat Shabbat Friday-evening synagogue service. From Israel it was introduced to the diaspora by the Arizal's students and Rabbi Moses Cordovero. It was printed for the first time in the beginning of the 17th century. In 1611 it was printed in the sefer Imrei Binah in Prague, and the following year in the sefer Tikkunei Shabbat in Kraków. It was subsequently translated into Judeo-Arabic, Ladino, and Persian by the various Jewish communities of the diaspora.

Song
The hymn consists of ten stanzas, with each stanza beginning with the words Bar Yochai. Referencing the Ten Sephirot, the stanzas describe how Simeon bar Yochai mastered each sephirah until he ascended to the "supreme mystery". The initial letters of the first nine stanzas (after the words Bar Yochai) spell out the Hebrew name of the poet, Shimon Lavi. After each stanza is a one-line refrain:

Bar Yochai, nimshachta ashrekha, shemen sasson mechaverekha
Bar Yochai – fortunate are you, anointed with joyous oil over and above your companions

The hymn incorporates expressions from Tanakh, rabbinical teachings and ideas, and expressions from the Zohar, displaying Lavi's own mastery of scriptural and kabbalistic sources.

Words

Customs

While the Jews of North Africa sang the hymn every Friday night before eating the Shabbat evening meal, the Jews of Eastern Europe did not adopt this practice. To this day, most Ashkenazi Jews do not sing the hymn at all of their Shabbat evening meals. The Artscroll Siddur indicates that many sing it Friday nights during Sfira.

Both Sephardi and Ashkenazi Jews sing the hymn on Lag BaOmer, the Yom Hillula (anniversary of death) of bar Yochai. Among Persian Jews, the hymn was sung on Friday nights in Hebrew and on Lag BaOmer in Persian.

Different customs were adopted by Sephardi, Ashkenazi, and Hasidic communities in Israel pertaining to the singing of the hymn during Friday-night synagogue services and/or at the Shabbat evening meal, but all groups sing the hymn on Lag BaOmer. In the northern Israeli town of Meron, site of the tomb of bar Yochai, the hymn is "heard around the clock" at the massive celebrations that take place there on Lag BaOmer.

The Ashkenazi tune for the hymn differs slightly from the Sephardi tune; the latter is the same as that sung by Lavi himself.

References

Notes

Sources

External links
 Hebrew lyrics on Wikisource (Hebrew)
 English translation of "Bar Yochai"

Hebrew-language songs
Lag BaOmer